Forest Home Township is a civil township of Antrim County in the U.S. state of Michigan. The population was 1,720 at the 2010 census.

Geography

Communities
Bellaire is partially located within Forest Home Township.  The larger portion of the village east of the Intermediate River is within Kearney Township.
Clam River was a village in the township that had a post office from 1911 until 1944.

Demographics
As of the census of 2000, there were 1,858 people, 790 households, and 571 families residing in the township. The racial makeup of the township was 98.01% White, 0.16% African American, 0.43% Native American, 0.43% Asian, 0.16% from other races, and 0.81% from two or more races. Hispanic or Latino of any race were 0.75% of the population.

There were 790 households, out of which 26.8% had children under the age of 18 living with them, 63.9% were married couples living together, 4.2% had a female householder with no husband present, and 27.6% were non-families. 24.7% of all households were made up of individuals, and 12.4% had someone living alone who was 65 years of age or older.  The average household size was 2.35 and the average family size was 2.76.

In the township the population was spread out, with 21.7% under the age of 18, 4.9% from 18 to 24, 23.3% from 25 to 44, 28.2% from 45 to 64, and 22.0% who were 65 years of age or older.  The median age was 45 years. For every 100 females, there were 95.4 males.  For every 100 females age 18 and over, there were 93.7 males.

The median income for a household in the township was $40,980, and the median income for a family was $51,000. Males had a median income of $32,461 versus $22,422 for females. The per capita income for the township was $24,319.  About 2.1% of families and 5.0% of the population were below the poverty line, including 3.2% of those under age 18 and 5.2% of those age 65 or over.

References

Notes

Sources

External links
Forest Home Township official website

Townships in Antrim County, Michigan
Townships in Michigan
Populated places established in 1871
1871 establishments in Michigan